J. B. Holman House is a historic home located at Batesburg-Leesville, Lexington County, South Carolina. It was built in 1910, and is an asymmetrical, two-story Queen Anne style frame residence. It features a polygonal, tent roofed turret and wraparound porch. The hipped porch is supported by paired Tuscan order colonettes. The gabled roof is sheet metal shingles and the house is sheathed in aluminum siding.

It was listed on the National Register of Historic Places in 1982.

References 

Houses on the National Register of Historic Places in South Carolina
Queen Anne architecture in South Carolina
Houses completed in 1910
Houses in Lexington County, South Carolina
National Register of Historic Places in Lexington County, South Carolina